, also known as , is a Shinto shrine in the city of Usa in Ōita Prefecture in Japan.  Emperor Ojin, who was deified as Hachiman-jin (the tutelary god of warriors), is said to be enshrined in all the sites dedicated to him; and the first and earliest of these was at Usa in the early 8th century.  The Usa Jingū has long been the recipient of Imperial patronage; and its prestige is considered second only to that of Ise.

History
The shrine was founded in Kyushu during the Nara period.  Ancient records place the foundation of Usa Jingū in the Wadō era (708–714). A temple called Miroku-ji was built next to it in 779, making it what is believed to be the first shrine-temple (jingū-ji) ever. The resulting mixed complex, called , lasted over a millennium until 1868, when the Buddhist part was removed to comply with the Kami and Buddhas Separation Act.   It is today the center from which over 40,000 branch Hachiman shrines have grown.  Usa's Hachiman shrine first appears in the chronicles of Imperial history during the reign of Empress Shōtoku.  The empress allegedly had an affair with a Buddhist monk named Dōkyō.  An oracle was said to have proclaimed that the monk should be made emperor; and the kami Hachiman at Usa was consulted for verification. The empress died before anything further could develop.
Kanpei-taisha
In the 16th century, the temple was razed to the ground and repeatedly attacked by the Christian-sympathizing lord of Funai Ōtomo Yoshishige. The wife of Yoshishige, Ōtomo-Nata Jezebel was the High Priestess alongside Nara Clan and resisted against her former husband's attacks.

Usa Jingū was designated as the chief Shinto shrine (ichinomiya) for the former Buzen province.

Other similarly honored Hachiman shrines were Iwashimizu Hachimangū of Yawata in Kyoto Prefecture and Hakozaki-gū of Fukuoka in Fukuoka Prefecture.

Mikoshi
The earliest recorded use of a mikoshi was in the 8th century.  In 749, the shrine's mikoshi was used to carry the spirit of Hachiman from Kyushu to Nara, where the deity was to guard construction of the great Daibutsu at Tōdai-ji.  By the 10th century, carrying mikoshi into the community during shrine festivals had become a conventional practice.

Branch shrines
Over the course of centuries, a vast number of Hachiman shrines have extended the reach of the kami at Usa:

In 859, a branch offshoot was established to spread Hachiman's protective influence over Kyoto; and this Iwashimizu Hachimangū still draws worshipers and tourists today.

In 923, the Hakozaki-gū was established at Fukuoka as a branch of the Usa Shrine.

In 1063, Tsurugaoka Hachimangū was established by Minamoto no Yoriyoshi to extend Hachiman's protective influence over Kamakura; and today this branch shrine attracts more visitors than any other shrine in Japan.

Hōjō-e festival
The ceremony is accompanied by sacred kagura dances meant to commemorate the souls of fish killed by fishermen during the previous year. This syncretic rite fusing Buddhism and Shinto, now performed in many shrines all over the country, first took place here.

Architecture
The main hall and the Kujaku Monkei are designated amongst Japan's National Treasures.
 
The structures which comprise the current shrine complex were built in the middle of the 19th century. Their characteristic configuration, called Hachiman-zukuri, consists of two parallel structures with gabled roofs interconnected on the non-gabled side to form what internally is a single building. Seen from the outside, however, the complex still gives the impression of being two separate buildings. The structure in front is called the ge-in, which is where the deity is said to reside during the daytime. The structure in the rear is called the nai-in, which serves as the deity's sleeping chamber during the night.

See also
List of Jingū
List of National Treasures of Japan (crafts-others)
List of National Treasures of Japan (shrines)
Ōita Prefectural Museum of History

References

Citations

Sources 

 Bender, Ross. "The Hachiman Cult and the Dōkyō Incident," Monumenta Nipponica. 24 (Summer 1979): 124.
 Hardacre, Helen. (1989).  Shinto and the State, 1868-1988. Princeton: Princeton University Press. ;  OCLC 19067219
 Ponsonby-Fane, Richard. (1962).  Studies in Shinto and Shrines. Kyoto: Ponsonby Memorial Society. OCLC 3994492
 Titsingh, Isaac. (1834).  Annales des empereurs du japon (Nipon o daï itsi ran).  Paris: Oriental Translation Fund of Great Britain and Ireland. 
 .

External links 

 Usa Shrine JAPAN : the Official Guide
 Shrine image, 180° panorama

Jingū
Religious organizations established in the 8th century
Shinto shrines in Ōita Prefecture
National Treasures of Japan
Shinbutsu shūgō
8th-century establishments in Japan
Beppyo shrines
Hachiman shrines
Religious buildings and structures completed in 725